Johnsontown is an unincorporated community at the junction of West Virginia Route 9 and Camp Frame Road along Tilhance Creek in Berkeley County, West Virginia, United States. The town was originally named Soho by settlers after Soho in London's West End. Its name was later changed to Johnstontown and finally Johnsontown.

Unincorporated communities in Berkeley County, West Virginia
Unincorporated communities in West Virginia